István Balázs (born 15 February 1952) is a Hungarian archer. He competed in the men's individual event at the 1980 Summer Olympics.

References

External links
 

1952 births
Living people
Hungarian male archers
Olympic archers of Hungary
Archers at the 1980 Summer Olympics
People from Esztergom
Sportspeople from Komárom-Esztergom County